No Pain, No Gain is a 2001 Spanish film directed by Víctor García León which stars Bárbara Lennie and Biel Duran.

Plot 
Displaying a far from idyllic vision of the teenage years, the fiction follows David, a teenager who finds out that, like everyone else, he is actually quite of a loser.

Cast

Production 
The screenplay was penned by the director Víctor García León alongside Jonás-Groucho. The score was composed by Diego San José. Ana Huete took over production duties. An Olmos Films production, the film had a 138 million ₧ budget.

Release 
The film screened at the Málaga Spanish Film Festival in June 2001, where it was well received. Distributed by Alta Classics, the film was theatrically released in Spain on 6 July 2001.

Accolades 

|-
| align = "center" | 2001 || 4th Málaga Spanish Film Festival || Silver Biznaga for Best Actor || Biel Durán ||  || 
|-
| align = "center" rowspan = "2" | 2002 || rowspan = "2" | 16th Goya Awards || Best New Director || Víctor García León ||  || rowspan = "2" | 
|-
| Best New Actor || Biel Durán ||  
|}

See also 
 List of Spanish films of 2001

Notes

References 

2000s Spanish-language films
Spanish drama films
Films directed by Víctor García León
2001 drama films
2000s Spanish films